KSMB may refer to:

 Kap Shui Mun Bridge, a cable-stayed bridge in Hong Kong
 KSMB (FM), a radio station (94.5 FM) licensed to Lafayette, Louisiana, United States
 KSMB (band), Swedish punk rock band